Aleksey Zhukov (born 11 January 1965) is a former Russian professional football coach and a player.

Club career
He played 2 games in the Soviet Top League in 1985 for FC SKA Rostov-on-Don. He then played in Finland for 16 seasons.

External links
 Player profile on Soccernet.ee
 

1965 births
Sportspeople from Volgograd
Living people
Soviet footballers
Russian footballers
Association football midfielders
Russian expatriate footballers
Expatriate footballers in Finland
Expatriate footballers in Estonia
FC Rotor Volgograd players
FC Energiya Volzhsky players
FC SKA Rostov-on-Don players
FC Spartak Vladikavkaz players
Rovaniemen Palloseura players
FC Lootus Kohtla-Järve players
FC Viikingit players
Soviet Top League players
Veikkausliiga players
Russian football managers